The Presbyterian Community in Congo is numerically the most influential and important Reformed denomination in the Democratic Republic of Congo. The denomination is a fruit of the American Presbyterian church in Congo which started in 1891. The church suffered controversies and splits during the 1950s and 1960s. During this period the Presbyterian Community in Eastern Kasai, Presbyterian Community in Western Kasai and the Reformed Community of Presbyterians was formed.

In West Kasai the church runs 150 primary schools and 52 secondary schools in East Kasai the church has 200 primary schools. The PCC has a printing press, bookstore and radio ministry and a Presbyterian University.

It has more than 1,250,000 members and almost 1,000 congregations with 53 presbyteries and 880 pastors and 61 evangelists.

There are official church contacts with the PC(USA) and with the Presbytery of Eastern Virginia.

Doctrine
Apostles Creed
Westminster Confession of Faith
Member of the World Communion of Reformed Churches

References

Presbyterian denominations in Africa
Members of the World Communion of Reformed Churches
Protestantism in the Democratic Republic of the Congo
1891 establishments in the Congo Free State